The King Alfonso XIII's Cup 1925 was the 25th staging of the Copa del Rey, the Spanish football cup competition.

Teams
A record twelve teams were invited to play the tournament, as the champion of Castile and León was also invited, while the Levante Championship was split into two tournaments: the Valencian Championship and the Murcian Championship.

The following eleven teams competed (the entry of Real Murcia, winners of the newly formed Championship of Murcia, was rejected):

Biscay: Arenas Club
Gipuzkoa: Real Sociedad
 Centre Region: Athletic Madrid
 South Region: Sevilla FC
Galicia: Celta de Vigo
Asturias: Stadium Ovetense
Cantabria: Racing de Santander
Catalonia: FC Barcelona
Aragon: Stadium de Zaragoza
Valencia: Valencia CF
Castile and León: CD Español

Group stage
The winner of each group advanced to the semifinals.

Group I

Group II

Tie-break match

Group III

Group IV

Semifinals
First leg:

Final

Notes

References
Linguasport.com
RSSSF.com

Copa del Rey seasons
Copa Del Rey, 1925
Copa